Ayumi Hamasaki Asia Tour 2008: 10th Anniversary was a concert tour of Asia held by Ayumi Hamasaki to celebrate her tenth anniversary as a performer under Avex Trax. The tour had stops across Japan as well as in Hong Kong, Shanghai and Taipei. This was also the first time the whole performance was filmed outside Japan.

Track listing

Disc 1
Rebirth
The Judgement Day
Talkin' 2 Myself
A Song for XX (replaced with "Is This Love?" in the Japan shows)
Depend on You
Fly High
(Don't) Leave Me Alone
Decision
My Name's Women
Marionette: Prelude
Marionette
Hanabi
End Roll
Tasking
Surreal / Evolution / Surreal
Mirrorcle World

Disc 2: Encore
Dearest
Voyage
Humming 7/4 (replaced with "Independent" in the Japan, Hong Kong, and Shanghai shows)
Boys & Girls
My All
Screen Videos
Rebirth
The Judgement Day
Depend on You
(Don't) Leave Me Alone
Marionette: Prelude + Marionette
Hanabi
Mirrorcle World

Disc 3
 （31 segments）
 （31 segments）

Tour dates

Charts
Oricon Overall Sales Chart (Japan)

References

2008 concert tours
Albums recorded at the Taipei Arena